Moshe Saada (born 14 September 1972) is an Israeli politician who currently serves as a member of the Knesset for Likud.

Biography
Saada worked for the Ministry of Justice as deputy head of the Police Internal Investigations Department.

Prior to the 2022 Knesset elections Saada was placed twenty-eighth on the Likud list.  He was elected to the Knesset as the party won 32 seats.

References

External links

1972 births
Living people
Israeli civil servants
Jewish Israeli politicians
Likud politicians
Members of the 25th Knesset (2022–)